Ningbo Center is a skyscraper under construction in Ningbo, China. Construction started since the New Year's Eve date on December 31, when the original date of construction was to start in 2018 but got delayed to 2019.

Ningbo Center Building started pile foundation construction since January 2019, and the structure will be fully topped out in the first half of 2023.

References

Skyscrapers in Zhejiang
Buildings and structures under construction in China
Buildings and structures in Ningbo